David Clark is an American illustrator who has produced work in newspapers. He received the National Cartoonist Society Newspaper Illustration Award for 1996 for his work. He has illustrated several children's books. He is the illustrator and co-creator of the syndicated comic strip Barney & Clyde, which debuted on June 7, 2010.

External links
NCS Awards 
Washington Post Writers Group - Barney & Clyde

American cartoonists
Living people
Pennsylvania Academy of the Fine Arts alumni
Artists from Chicago
Reuben Award winners
Year of birth missing (living people)
Place of birth missing (living people)